Harold Edward "Hal" Schwenk (August 23, 1890 – September 4, 1955) was a Major League Baseball pitcher who played in one game for the St. Louis Browns on September 4, .

External links
Baseball Reference.com

1890 births
1955 deaths
St. Louis Browns players
Major League Baseball pitchers
Baseball players from Pennsylvania
Oakland Oaks (baseball) players
Saginaw Ducks players
Burlington Pathfinders players